George Edgar Vincent (March 21, 1864 – February 2, 1941) was an American sociologist and university president.

Biography
He was born at Rockford, Illinois, the son of Bishop John H. Vincent.  He studied at Yale, where he was a member of Delta Kappa Epsilon fraternity and served on the thirteenth editorial board of The Yale Record. After graduating in 1885, he engaged in journalistic and literary work.

In 1888 he became associated with the Chautauqua system as vice principal, and after 1907 was president of the Chautauqua Institution (of the Chautauqua movement).

From 1892 to 1894 he was a fellow at the University of Chicago, in the first Department of Sociology in the United States. He was appointed to the Chicago faculty in 1894 and became a professor of sociology in 1904.  From 1900 to 1907 he was dean of the junior colleges, and from 1907 to 1911 he was dean of the faculties of arts, literature, and science.

In 1911 he became the third president of the University of Minnesota in Minneapolis/Saint Paul, Minnesota. Drawing on his experience with the Chautauqua Institute, he helped found the General Extension Division (the predecessor of the College of Continuing Education) to provide working adults with access to the University's courses. While at the U of MN, Vincent put in place innovative programming including 'University Weeks' with plays, lectures, concerts and debates similar to the Chautauqua Institute, in the spirit of increasing educational and cultural opportunities for the general public.

Vincent Hall on the University of Minnesota's East Bank campus is named in his honor. Vincent Hall is home to the School of Mathematics.

In 1917 he took the position of president of the Rockefeller Foundation.

References

Works
 An Introduction to the Study of Society (1894)  with Albion W. Small, the first sociology textbook
 The Social Mind and Education (1896)
 The National Memory (1913)

Further reading

External links

 
 Works by George Edgar Vincent, at JSTOR
 Obituary, American Sociological Review, 1941
 

1864 births
1941 deaths
American sociologists
American textbook writers
American male non-fiction writers
Sociology educators
People from Rockford, Illinois
Yale University alumni
Presidents of the University of Minnesota
University of Chicago faculty
Presidents of the American Sociological Association
Presidents of the Rockefeller Foundation